Konstantinos Kokkinakis (Greek: Κωνσταντίνος Κοκκινάκης, born 9 October 1975 in Ioannina, Greece) is a Greek water polo player who competed in the 2008 Summer Olympics and 2012 Summer Olympics. He played for Ethnikos (until 2008), Panionios (2008-2011), Panathinaikos (2011-2012), Nireas Lamias (2013-2014)  and Ydraikos.

Honours 
Ethnikos Piraeus

 Greek Championship: 2006

 Greek Cup: 2000, 2005

 LEN Cup 3rd place: 2003

Panionios

 LEN Cup Finalist: 2009

References 

1975 births
Living people
Sportspeople from Ioannina
Greek male water polo players
Olympic water polo players of Greece
Water polo players at the 2008 Summer Olympics
Water polo players at the 2012 Summer Olympics
Ethnikos WPC
Survivor Greece contestants

Ethnikos Piraeus Water Polo Club players